Teen Bhubaner Paare (তিন ভুবনের পারে)  is a Bengali movie, inspired by Samaresh Basu's novel, released in 1969. The songs "Hoyto Tomari Jonno"(হয়তো তোমারই জন্য)  & "Jibone Ki Pabo Na"(জীবনে কি পাবো না)  sung by Manna Dey are still very famous among Bengali youth. The film was a big hit in the history of Bengali Cinema.

Cast 
Soumitra Chatterjee
Tanuja
Rabi Ghosh
Chinmoy Roy
Tarun Kumar Chatterjee
Sumita Sanyal

References

1969 films
Bengali-language Indian films
1960s Bengali-language films